Bayakoa Stakes may refer to:

 Bayakoa Stakes (Los Alamitos), a thoroughbred horse race at Los Alamitos Race Course in California
 Bayakoa Stakes (Oaklawn Park), a thoroughbred horse race at Oaklawn Park in Hot Springs, Arkansas